John Wilson (8 June 1799, Kilmarnock district, Scotland – 22 January 1870, Brighton, England ) was one of the ideological architects of the British Israelite movement, along with Edward Wheler Bird and Edward Hine.

Wilson was a self educated man.  In 1840, he published Our Israelitish Origin, a book of his lectures, in which he claimed that the Ten Lost Tribes of Israel had made their way from the Near East, across the continent of Europe, to the British Isles. He believed the Northern European people to be descended from the Ten Lost Tribes, with the people of Britain being the Tribe of Ephraim. Wilson relied on philological "evidence" of English, Scottish, and Irish words that were similar to Hebrew words, even though he lacked formal training in language or seminary.

His lectures attracted the attention of, among others, Charles Piazzi Smyth, Astronomer Royal for Scotland and one of the first Pyramidologists.

It was in Wilson's house in St Pancras, London, that the Anglo-Israel Association was founded in 1874.

On the death of Wilson's daughter in 1904, his manuscripts passed into the possession of Rev. A. B. Grimaldi.

References

External links

Our Israelitish Origins by John Wilson

1799 births
1870 deaths
British Israelism
People from Kilmarnock
19th-century British people
19th-century British writers